The Mystery of the Spiteful Letters was one of the novels in Enid Blyton's The Five Find-Outers series, and the fourth book overall in The Five Find-Outers series, published in 1946 by Methuen and illustrated by Joseph Abbey.

Plot introduction
The Five Find-Outers - Fatty, Larry, Daisy, Pip and Bets, and their Scottie dog, Buster, are shocked when someone starts sending anonymous spiteful letters to several people in their village of Peterswood. Pip and Bets are involved when their young maid Gladys receives one of the letters, which reveals a secret - her parents are in prison for theft and she has lived in a girls home. Frightened and distraught, Gladys leaves her job. The children decide that they must discover who is sending the letters. They make a list of suspects - could the letter writer be Mr. Nosey a busybody or Miss Tittle a lover of gossip - or someone else? Their arch-enemy, village policeman Mr Goon is also on the case, and the children must hurry to solve the mystery before he does.

External links
 
Enid Blyton Society page

1946 British novels
Novels by Enid Blyton
Methuen Publishing books
1946 children's books